Miyan Taleqan Rural District is in the Central District of Taleqan County, Alborz province, Iran. Formerly, it was in Taleqan District of Savojbolagh County, Tehran province, before the formation of Alborz province. It is in the Alborz (Elburz) mountain range. At the census of 2006, its population was 9,873 in 2,779 households, and in the most recent census of 2016, it had decreased to 2,271 in 859 households. The largest of its 24 villages was Zidasht, with 816 people.

References 

Taleqan County

Rural Districts of Alborz Province

Populated places in Alborz Province

Populated places in Taleqan County